The Battle of Campo Jordán occurred during the Chaco War, with victory going to the Bolivians, who forced the Paraguayans to retreat towards Gondra, on losing Alihuatá and the supply route of the Saavedra-Alihuatá road.

Bibliography 
Masamaclay, historia de la guerra del Chaco, Segunda edición

Campo Jordan
1933 in Paraguay
1933 in Bolivia